Brachytes is a genus of seed bugs in the tribe Daladerini, erected by John Obadiah Westwood in 1842.

References

External links
 

Coreidae genera